Yaquina Head is a headland extending into the Pacific Ocean north of Newport, in the U.S. state of Oregon. It is the site of the Yaquina Head Light, and is managed as Yaquina Head Outstanding Natural Area by the Bureau of Land Management. It is part of the National Landscape Conservation System, commonly known as the National Conservation Lands.

The United States Congress named the  headland an Outstanding Natural Area in 1980.

Other attractions include whale-watching, bird-watching, visiting the site's interpretive center, and touring the lighthouse. 

Ancient lava flows formed Yaquina Head.

See also
Oregon Coast
Yaquina Head Light
Yaquina River

References

External links
 Yaquina Head Outstanding Natural Area - BLM page

Headlands of Oregon
Newport, Oregon
Landforms of Lincoln County, Oregon
Protected areas of Lincoln County, Oregon
Bureau of Land Management areas in Oregon
Units of the National Landscape Conservation System